Ángel Heladio Aguirre Rivero (born 21 April 1956) is a Mexican politician affiliated with the PRD, formerly to the PRI, who served as Governor of Guerrero from 2011 until he stepped down October 23, 2014. He has been a member of both the Chamber of Deputies and the Senate.  He served as interim Governor of Guerrero between 1996 and 1999. He served a later term as Governor of Guerrero between 2011-2014.

Political career
Angel Aguirre Rivero took a degree in Economics from the National Autonomous University of Mexico, where he also served as professor in the same faculty. In 1991, he was postulated  and elected as Deputy for the Sixth Federal Electoral District of Guerrero to the LV Legislature of the Mexican Congress from 1991 to 1994, from 1993 to 1996 was also President of the PRI in the State of Guerrero.

On 12 March 1996, the then governor of Guerrero, Rubén Figueroa Alcocer, requested to leave his post due to the Aguas Blancas massacre, where peasants were murdered by agents of the state police at the ford of Aguas Blancas in the municipality of Coyuca de Benítez; the same day, the Congress of Guerrero appointed him as interim governor, finishing the remainder of Figueroa's term until 31 March 1999.

In 2003, he was elected again as Deputy for the LIX Legislature representing Guerrero. In 2006 he was nominated as a candidate for Senator for the PRI in the first formula of the candidatures, being second in the election and therefore occupying the seat of "First minority".

On 25 August 2010, Aguirre announced that he would leave his membership in the PRI and become the PRD candidate for governor of Guerrero, subsequently winning the January 30, 2011 elections and taking office on 1 April.

References

External links
  Official website of the Governature of Guerrero

1956 births
Living people
Politicians from Guerrero
National Autonomous University of Mexico alumni
Members of the Senate of the Republic (Mexico)
Members of the Chamber of Deputies (Mexico)
Governors of Guerrero
Institutional Revolutionary Party politicians
Party of the Democratic Revolution politicians
21st-century Mexican politicians
Academic staff of the National Autonomous University of Mexico
20th-century Mexican politicians